André Julien, Comte Dupuy, was Governor General of French India between 1816 and 1825. He was born in 1753.

Life
He was Governor General of Pondicherry between September 1816 to October 1825. After Treaty of Paris (1814), Pondicherry and its territories were returned to French by British for the third and last time. Then Comte Dupuy was made Governor General of it. Today we can find a street named upon him (Rue Comte Dupuy) in Pondicherry.

Titles

French colonial governors and administrators
Comtes Dupuy
People of the Bourbon Restoration
1753 births
19th-century deaths